Willenhall Bilston Street railway station was a station built on the Grand Junction Railway in 1837. It served the town of Willenhall, and was located just to the south of the town centre. It was one of two railway stations in the town - the other being Willenhall Stafford Street.

The station is planned to reopen in 2023.

Closure

The station closed in 1965, and there is little evidence of the existence at the site. The lines through the station are in use today as part of the Walsall to Wolverhampton Line.

Potential reopening 

There were proposals within the West Midlands Local Transport plan to reopen the station for passenger traffic, but these were shelved. In December 2016, as part of the New Station Fund 2 project, the West Midlands County Council put proposals in to reopen the station to passenger services.

In September 2017, the West Midlands Combined Authority proposed that the station along with  would reopen by 2027 as part of a £4 billion transport plan.

In March 2018, the station was awarded funding to reopen and would be the first time Willenhall has had a rail connection in over 40 years. The then Transport minister Chris Grayling confirmed it will reopen.

The new station will now be constructed on the Wolverhampton side of Bilston Street.

Planning applications for the two stations were formally submitted in March 2020 and were granted permission in October 2020. It is currently planned that the station will reopen to passengers in 2023.

References

External links
 West Midlands Local Transport Plan for the corridor 

Disused railway stations in Walsall
Railway stations in Great Britain opened in 1837
Railway stations in Great Britain closed in 1965
1837 establishments in England
1965 disestablishments in England
Beeching closures in England
Former London and North Western Railway stations
Willenhall